Diarsia borneochracea is a moth of the family Noctuidae. It is endemic to Borneo.

Characteristics 
The species is the smallest in Borneo; the forewings are an ochreous fawn with darker brown markings. The posterior half of the reniform stigma is usually darkened. In facies the species resembles ochracea Walker from Sri Lanka and gaudens Hampson from Java but is distinguished by reduction of the spined band of the aedeagus to two or three unequal spines downturned at the apex of the aedeagus. The dorsally directed process of the harpe is much more strongly sinuous than in either of these species.

External links
Species info

Diarsia
Moths described in 1989